José Alberto Castro (born José Alberto Sáinz Castro, 31 May 1963) is a Mexican producer and director.

Biography
He is the brother of actresses Verónica Castro, Beatriz Castro, telenovela producer Fausto Gerardo Sáinz, and uncle of Mexican singer Cristian Castro. Began his career in the production crew in the telenovela Mi pequeña Soledad.

He was married to Angélica Rivera from 1994–2008, The couple had three daughters: Angélica Sofía (b. 1996), Fernanda (b. 1999) and Regina (b. 2005).

He worked as a producer of variety shows presented by Verónica Castro, such as the La movida (1991), Vero América va! (1992), En la noche (1994) and La tocada (1996).

In 1993 debut as executive producer of telenovelas in Valentina starring Verónica Castro, Juan Ferrara and Rafael Rojas.

Filmography

Awards and nominations

Premios TVyNovelas

Premios People en Español

References

External links

1963 births
Living people
Mexican telenovela directors
Mexican telenovela producers
People from Mexico City